The list of Moscow State University people includes notable alumni, non-graduates, and faculty affiliated with the Lomonosov Moscow State University (also known as "Moscow State University"). A fuller list is available as a category.

Notable awards recipients

Nobel laureates

Fields Medal laureates

 Vladimir Drinfeld (attended 1969–1974) - Soviet-American mathematician; winner of the Fields Medal in 1990; Harry Pratt Judson Distinguished Service Professor at the University of Chicago
 Maxim Kontsevich (attended 1980–1985) - Russian-French mathematician; winner of the Fields Medal in 1998
 Grigory Margulis, PhD 1970 - Russian-American mathematician; Erastus L. De Forest Professor of Mathematics at Yale University; winner of the Fields Medal in 1978
 Sergei Novikov, BA 1960  - mathematician; winner of the Fields Medal in 1970
 Andrei Okounkov, PhD 1995 - mathematician; winner of the Fields Meda] in 2006; Professor of Mathematics at Princeton University
 Vladimir Voevodsky (attended 1982) - Russian-American mathematician

Turing Award laureates
 C. A. R. Hoare (attended as graduate student) - British computer scientist; winner of Turing Award in 1980

Literature, journalism and philosophy

Academics

Astronomy 

 Alexander Salomonovich - radio astronomer

Chemistry
 Nikolay Emanuel - specialist in chemical kinetics and mechanics of chemical reactions
 Aleksandr Oparin - biochemist
 Natalia Shustova - Professor of Chemistry
 Nguyen Dinh Duc - researcher of composite materials in Vietnam
 Nikolay Semyonov - professor of chemistry; Nobel Prize in Chemistry 1956

Computer science
 Georgy Adelson-Velsky - Soviet-Israeli inventor of AVL tree algorithm; developer of Kaissa (the first World Computer Chess Champion)
 C. A. R. Hoare - British computer scientist; winner of Turing Award in 1980
 Alexander Stepanov - Russian-American, known for C++ Standard Template Library

Economics
 Sergey Glazyev - economist, politician
 Yuri Maltsev - Austrian School economist

Engineering
Klaudia Sergejewna Kildisheva (1917 - 1994),aviation engineer and H ero of Socialist Labor
Victor Lyatkher (1933), renewable energy engineer

Geosciences
 Boris Fedtschenko - botanist
 Naomi Feinbrun-Dothan - Russian-Israeli botanist
 Boris Kozo-Polyansky - botanist and evolutionary biologist
 Grigori Gamburtsev - seismologist
 Grigorii Kozhevnikov - entomologist

History
 Zalpa Bersanova - Chechen ethnographer and author
 Anatoly Bokschanin - historian of Rome, professor
 Vladimir Guerrier - historian and founder of higher education for women in Russia
 Vasily Klyuchevsky - historian
 Nikolai Mashkin - historian of Rome, professor
 Suleyman Aliyarli - Azeri historian and Turkologist
 Sigurd Schmidt - historian, ethnographer
 Alec Rasizade - American historian and political scientist

Linguistics and philology
 Victor Bayda - linguist
 Ahmet Cevat Emre - Turkish linguist
 Margalit Finkelberg - Belarusian-Israeli historian and linguist
 Vyacheslav Ivanov - philologist
 Yuri Knorozov - Russian linguist, epigrapher and ethnographer
 Anatoly Moskvin - academic and linguist, arrested in 2011 after the bodies of 26 mummified young women were discovered in his home.

Mathematics

Paleontology
 Alexei Petrovich Pavlov - paleontologist and geologist 
 Maria Vasillievna Pavlova - paleontologist

Pedagogy
 Victor Della-Vos
Alexander Bogomolny, Israeli American mathematician; creator of the mathematical education website Cut-the-Knot

Physics

 Fidel Castro Díaz-Balart - Nuclear physicist

Psychology
 Georgy Shchedrovitsky
 Lev Semenovich Vygotsky - psychologist

Sociology
 Georgi Derluguian - sociologist
 Yuri Levada - sociologist

Other

Business and finance
 Pyotr Aven
 Oleg Deripaska
 Margarita Louis-Dreyfus, Russian-born French billionaire, chairman of Louis Dreyfus
 Elena Kotova
 Alexander Mamut
 Oleg Vyugin, former head of Russian financial markets regulator

Musicians and actors

 Nipun Akter - actress
 Sergei Bodrov, Jr. - actor
 Nashenas - Afghan musician
 Natalia O'Shea - singer-songwriter
 Alla Yoshpe - singer
 Elena Zoubareva - opera singer
 Elena Katina - singer

Religion 

 ʻAlí-Akbar Furútan, Hand of the Cause of the Baháʼí Faith

Sport
 Marina Granovskaia - director at Chelsea F.C.
Nikita Mazepin - Former Formula 1 driver of Team Haas F1

Visual arts
 Anna Alchuk - poet and visual artist
 Wassily Kandinsky - painter, printmaker and art theorist
 Vsevolod Meyerhold - theatre director and producer
 Ernst Neizvestny - sculptor, painter, graphic artist, and art philosopher
 Vladimir Nemirovich-Danchenko - theatre director, writer
 Leonid Pasternak - post-impressionist painter
 Vsevolod Pudovkin - film director
 Yulia Spiridonova - photographer

Video games
 Vadim Gerasimov -  co-developer of Tetris

See also
 :Category:Moscow State University alumni
 List of Russian scientists

References

Moscow State University
State University
Moscow State University